The Société Nationale des Postes et Services Financiers is the public operator responsible for postal service in Comoros. Nadjib Dhakoine was appointed as the CEO in April of 2017.

See also
 Communications in Comoros

References

Companies of the Comoros
Comoros